Lhaimagu (Dhivehi: ޅައިމަގު) is one of the inhabited islands of the Shaviyani Atoll administrative division and geographically part of the Miladhummadulhu Atoll in the Maldives.

History

Lhaimagu is well known among the Maldivian for Lhaimagu Faqeeraa, who is a mystic supposed to be from Lhaimagu. He is most famously mentioned in the folklore of Dhonhiyala aaie Alifulhu.

Another legendary figure is Hadheebee Kamanaa to whom is dedicated Hadheebee Magu and Hadheebee mosque in Male'.

Geography

Demography

Transport
A dhoni ride from the capital Male' could take approximately 10 hours, while a speedboat would take about 3 hours to reach the island.

References

Islands of the Maldives